Zhovti Vody is a town in Kamianske Raion and central Ukraine. It hosts the administration of Zhovti Vody urban hromada, one of the hromadas of Ukraine. Population: .

It was a center for the extraction and processing of uranium ore. The mine and processing plant have since closed.

History
The historic Battle of Zhovti Vody was fought on the site of the present-day city.

The area has been referred to by the term Zhovti Vody (literally 'yellow waters') since before the founding of the first village on the site in 1895.

Until 18 July 2020, Zhovti Vody was incorporated as a city of oblast significance and the center of Zhovti Vody Municipality. The municipality was abolished in July 2020 as part of the administrative reform of Ukraine, which reduced the number of raions of oblast. The area of Zhovti Vody Municipality was merged into the newly established Kamianske Raion.

Demographics

Sport
There's a bandy team.

Gallery

Famous People 
 Inna Tsyganok, a professional Ukrainian biathlete
 Anastasiya Polyanskaya, a professional Russian biathlete

References

External links

  Zhovti Vody News
  Information Card of the City - official site of the Parliament of Ukraine

Zhovti Vody
Mining cities and regions in Ukraine
Cities of regional significance in Ukraine
Populated places established in the Russian Empire
Former closed cities